Libyan Cup 2008-09 - First Round

All times given as local time (UTC+2)
The draw was made by the Libyan Football Federation on February 19, 2009 at 11:00 local time.

Eastern Section
There are 20 sides entering, 15 from the Libyan Second Division and 5 from the Libyan Third Division.

Group A
Butnan and Jabal al Akhdar

Match 1: February 25, 2009, 15:30, Al Bayda Stadium, Referee: Ibrahim al FakhiryShabab al Jabal 4 - 2 Al Qairawan

Match 2: February 26, 2009, 15:30, Derna Stadium, Referee: Mohammad al ZallawiAl Afriqi 0 - 2 Al BaranesIbrahim al Houti , Ahmad al Suaity 

Match 3: March 6, 2009, 15:30, Al Bayda Stadium, Referee: Abdallah FdhailAl Ansaar 2 - 1 Al SuqoorMuftah al Suaity , Yousef Khamees  ; Mohammed Saad , Alsharif Ahmed 

1Match re-arranged from February 26, 2009 (due to bad weather)

Group B
Benghazi and Gulf of Sidra

Match 4: February 25, 2009, 14:00, First Statement Stadium, Referee: Mohammad al JilalyAl Murooj 1 - 3 Nojom Ajdabiya

Match 5: February 25, 2009, 16:00, First Statement Stadium, Referee: Ahmad al BouishiAl Hurriya 1 - 0 Nojom Benghazi

Match 6: February 26, 2009, 14:00, First Statement Stadium, Referee: Nabeel al KoushBenghazi al Jadeeda 6 - 0 Al Libbah

Match 7: February 26, 2009, 16:00, First Statement Stadium, Referee: Mohammad Shu'aibAl Hadaf 1 - 3 Wefaq Ajdabiya

Western Section

Group C
Tripoli and Zawiya

Match 1 - February 26, 2009, 15:30, Zuwara Stadium, Referee: Ashraf al BalsousAl Mustaqbal 2 - 3 Abi al Ashar

Match 2 - February 26, 2009, 17:00, GMR Stadium, Referee: Abdelrahman al HraizyAl Dhahra T 1 - 0 Sikat al Hadeed

Match 3 - February 25, 2009, 16:00, GMR Stadium, Referee: Lutfi BalluAbu Moliyana 0 - 1 Al Yarmouk

Group D
Misrata and Sabha

Match 4 - February 26, 2009, 15:30, Bani Walid Stadium, Referee: Adil al SwaisyAl Dhahra B. 0 - 5 Al Qal'aaBasheer al Hillu , Rasheed  , Anwar Tahir , Abdesalam Inqaam 

Match 5 - February 26, 2009, 16:00, Sabha Stadium, Referee: Khalid al SaydAl Mahdeeya 4 - 0 Al Shmoo'e(Al Shmoo'e  12'), Abdesalam Kames  , Ali Benbouna  

Match 6 - February 26, 2009, 16:00, Baazah Stadium, Referee: Mohammad al Za'aloukNojoom Al Baazah 3 - 1 Al ChararaSaheel Douzaan , Munder al Haris , Atiq Ateeq  ;

References

1